Montrose House is a late 17th-century Grade II* listed building at 186 Petersham Road, Petersham in the London Borough of Richmond upon Thames.

The house was built for Sir Thomas Jenner, Justice of the Common Pleas under James II, but is named after the Dowager Duchess of Montrose (widow of the 3rd Duke) who lived there from 1837 to 1847. In the 1870s it was occupied by John Master, a retired magistrate from the Indian Colonial Service, his wife Gertrude, and his children. One of his daughters, Hilda Master, went on to become the mother of Sir Anthony Blunt. It was bought by the entertainer Tommy Steele in 1969 and sold by him in about 2004.

The house is located at a sharp right-angled bend on Petersham Road (part of the A307). After a spate of serious accidents on the bend in the road, the neighbours formed a group in the 1850s called Trustees of the Road.  The Hon. Algernon Tollemache of Ham House was their leader and they managed to persuade the owner of Montrose House to part with some land to reduce the sharpness of the bend.  However, various dents in the brick wall today reveal that motorists are still taken unawares by it.

Adjacent to Montrose House is Rutland Lodge, built in 1660 for a Lord Mayor of London.

Montrose House in art
A drawing of the rear of Montrose House was made by Wilfred Fairclough in July 1941 as part of the "Recording Britain" collection of topographical water-colours and drawings produced in the early 1940s during the Second World War. It is held at the Victoria and Albert Museum.

References

1600s establishments in England
Grade II* listed buildings in the London Borough of Richmond upon Thames
Grade II* listed houses in London
Houses completed in the 17th century
Houses in the London Borough of Richmond upon Thames
Petersham, London